XHPZ-FM is a radio station on 96.7 FM in Ciudad Guzmán, Jalisco. It is known as Radio Sensación.

History
XHPZ received its concession on June 29, 1979. It was owned by Jorge Valdovinos López.

References

Radio stations in Jalisco